Garumuni Robert de Zoysa was a Ceylonese politician. He was member of State Council of Ceylon	elected	from Balapitiya from the Ceylon National Congress. His brothers were Ian de Zoysa and Arthur de Zoysa. Herbert Sri Nissanka was his nephew.

References 

Date of birth missing
Sinhalese politicians
Members of the 1st State Council of Ceylon